The Jinji Expressway runs entirely within Tianjin, and links Tianjin city in the south with Ji County in the north. Hence the name Tianjin - Ji County - Jinji Expressway. The expressway runs for 104 kilometres. It opened on 26 September 2003, just days before October 1 - China's National Day holiday.

Route
It starts just after the Jinzhonglu exit on the Jingjintang Expressway and the Tianjin outer ring road, and heads northeast, gradually heading north, eventually crossing the Jingshen Expressway at Jinwei (Baodi North).

After this, it heads directly north toward Ji County, crossing China National Highway 102, before coming to an end at Bangxi Highway, near Ji County.

The expressway passes through Dongli District, Beichen District, Baodi District and Ji County.

The northern end is close to portions of the Great Wall of China. This end has been linked up to the Jingping Expressway since 2008. The Jinji Expressway therefore forms another (somewhat indirect) passageway from Beijing to Tianjin.

Exits and Service Areas
The expressway has remarkably few exits and just one service area. Additional toll charges apply for vehicles of non-Tianjin licence plates coming into Tianjin, waived only for military and diplomatic vehicles, as well as vehicles on emergency duty.

Speed Limit
There is a uniform speed limit of 110 km/h, albeit national legislation raising it to 120 km/h (which is the speed limit it was actually designed for).

Expressways in China
Road transport in Tianjin